Terry James Young (born 20 February 1968) is an Australian politician who has been a member of the House of Representatives since the 2019 federal election, representing the Division of Longman in Queensland. He is a member of the Liberal National Party of Queensland and sits with the Liberal Party in federal parliament.

Early life
Young was born on 20 February 1968 in Brisbane, Queensland. His mother Rita was a schoolteacher and his father Jim was a journalist and newspaper editor. He is of South Sea Islander descent, with one of his ancestors brought to Australia as a Kanaka. Young attended Kallangur Primary School and Dakabin State High School. He left school at the age of 15, subsequently working as a garage attendant, factory hand, and storeperson.

Young is one of just 4 members of the 46th Parliament of Australia who did not graduate from high school, the others being Julie Collins, Llew O'Brien and Jacqui Lambie.

Business career
Young joined appliance chain Chandlers as a sales assistant in 1988 and by 1991 was manager of its Caboolture store. He worked for Philips between 1996 and 2000 as a manager in its electronics and car audio divisions. In 2001 he became a joint franchisee of The Good Guys in Morayfield. He later established Drummond Golf franchises in Lawnton, Maroochydore and Gosford, New South Wales.

Politics
In November 2018, Young won LNP preselection for the Division of Longman. He had previously contested preselection for the 2018 Longman by-election, but was defeated by Trevor Ruthenberg. At the 2019 federal election, he defeated the incumbent Labor MP Susan Lamb with a four-point swing.

Young serves on the House of Representatives Standing committees for "Employment, Education and Training", "Indigenous Affairs" and "Tax and Revenue", which he was appointed to on 4 July 2019.

According to The Courier-Mail, Young is Caboolture's second most influential person of 2021.

Political views
Young is a member of the centre-right faction of the Liberal Party.

In his maiden speech to parliament, Young stated "I love being a conservative and I love being part of a conservative government". He also said that children should not be "brain-washed with extreme left or right ideologies" but that "we want our children and grandchildren to hear the theories of evolution and creation, different religions, climate change advocates and climate change sceptics".

Personal life
Young had two sons and two daughters with his first wife, whom he married at the age of 21; one of his sons died of sudden infant death syndrome. He later had another daughter with his second wife.

References
Notes

Citations

1968 births
Living people
Liberal Party of Australia members of the Parliament of Australia
Members of the Australian House of Representatives
Members of the Australian House of Representatives for Longman
Liberal National Party of Queensland politicians
Australian businesspeople in retailing
Australian people of Melanesian descent